Joseph Beverley may refer to:

 Joe Beverley (1856–1897), English footballer
 Joseph Beverley (MP) (died 1561), English politician